Quaternary science is the study which represents the systematic study of the Quaternary Period commonly known as the ice age.  The Quaternary Period is a time period that started around 2.58 million years ago and continues today. This period is divided into two epochs – the Pleistocene Epoch and the Holocene Epoch. The aim of Quaternary science is to understand everything that happened during the Pleistocene Epoch and the Holocene Epoch to be able to acquire fundamental knowledge about Earth's environment, ecosystem, climate changes, etc. Quaternary science was first studied during the nineteenth century by Georges Cuvier, a French scientist. Most Quaternary scientists have studied the history of the Quaternary to predict future changes in climate. 

Quaternary science plays a vital role in archaeology providing a possible accurate human studies' framework which would help the archaeologists interpret archaeological records.

Definition 
Quaternary science is the systematic study of the Quaternary Period. It is a rapidly changing field with new research techniques being developed e.g. new dating techniques. Quaternary science is a field of study which involves geography, biology, chemistry, and physics. Its focus is during the Quaternary Period – a time period that started around 2.58 million years ago and which continues to the present day. Earth has been affected by the events that occurred during the Quaternary Period – a time of ice ages. One topic in Quaternary science is to understand what happened during the ice ages. Quaternary science adds an important historical perspective to the understanding of current ecosystems and climate changes.

History 

The Quaternary Period was a geologic time period that could be separated into two epochs – Pleistocene ("most recent") Epoch, which is often defined as the time period that began around 2.58 million years ago to approximately around 11,700 years ago, and the Holocene ("wholly modern") Epoch, which began around 11,700 years ago right after the Pleistocene Epoch. While the study of Quaternary science actually began around the late eighteenth century in Europe, its study only truly started to develop and expand during the twentieth century when many significant sub-disciplines of Quaternary science – such as palaeoecology, palaeontology, and palaeoclimatology, emerged as an approach to reveal the relationship between the changes in the environment and this planet's history during its Quaternary Period. Initially, the term "Quaternary" was used by an Italian engineer – Giovanni Arduino, to describe the four most recent geologic eras. It was only later on that it became clear that the term ‘Quaternary’ was as described by Meadows and Finch (2016) as "a phrase of highly variable climates, with marked periods of time when global temperatures were significantly lower than today and evidence for which was interpreted by Louis Agassiz as indications of a geologically recent ‘Great Ice Age’".

The study of Quaternary science was first demonstrated by an early nineteenth century French scientist – Georges Cuvier. He proposed that the extinctions of some animals that once lived in the Pleistocene epoch were due to them being wiped out by some environmental ‘revolution’ (e.g. some catastrophic flooding events). It was this revelation that made him famous in that era for establishing that extinction is real.  

Around the nineteenth century, theory regarding to the causation of the ice ages also was fostered. The first theory to come out was the theory of how the variation of Earth's orbit affect the global climate by James Croll, a Scottish scientist. James Croll was the first person to ever recognize the significance of positive feedbacks in the climate system, including the feedbacks of ice-albedo. Furthermore, his theory was also the first theory to predict the cause of glaciation. It was during the twentieth century that this idea was further elaborated. Milutin Milankovitch, a Serbian mathematician and geophysicist, was best known for his theory which involved the motion of the Earth and their relationship to long-term climate changes. One of early calculations of Milankovitch offered information about the changes in incident solar radiation (as a function of season) for millions of years. In addition, André Berger – a Belgian professor and climatologist, also identified the certain time period where reconstructed insolation was higher than the average or lower than the average. Many of his analyses show that from May to August, there has been a forwarded shift of insolation maximum (higher than average) in the late Quaternary insolation variation. This feature is known as "insolation signature" and may have possible relationship with the changes in climate as contemplated by Berger.

Latest developments

There are many studies of Quaternary science being researched in the present. As stated before, Quaternary science is rapidly changing field, hence why there are always new researches being studied and published – providing evidences and establishing new techniques. One of the latest researches was the study about the "Late Pleistocene–Holocene environmental and climatic history of a freshwater paramo ecosystem in the northern Andes" where the researchers study the palaeoclimatic history of the Northern South America based on the palaeolimnological reconstruction of a pond. Another recent study would be the study of "Molecular fossils as a tool for tracking Holocene sea‐level change in the Loch of Stenness, Orkney" by Conti, Bates, Preece, Penkman, and Keely (2020), in which they study how molecular fossils could be used as an approach to study past sea-level change. There are still many more researches being done right now. After all, Quaternary science is the study of our history spanning the last 2.58 million years, there are so many things left to be discovered.

Quaternary science also played an important role in another area of science – archaeology. Archaeology is the field of science which uses material remains to study the human past. There are many types of archaeology as this field of study is a diverse field. Some archaeologists study the remains of the human – bioarchaeology, some study the ancient plants – paleoethnobotany, and some even study the stone tools. Furthermore, not every archaeologist is specialized in the same area, some archaeologist specialized in technologies which help located a map or sites, while some are a specialist in studying human remains underwater. Quaternary science has offered a precise and comprehensive framework to human studies which help the global interpretation of the archaeological records in the field of archaeology. For an illustration, some of the commonly known frameworks which contributed to the global interpretation of the records are chronology, palaeoenvironmental background and site formation processes.

One of the important focuses of Quaternary science in archaeology is the study of geochronology. Geochronology is the study of science concerning the ages and dates of Earth's material (e.g. rocks, fossils, etc.) and events. This area of research was deemed to be very significant to the archaeology of Indigenous Australia due to the fact that there are very few cultural markers that can be used for the relative chronology. The relative chronology in archaeology is normally used in places that are easily identified on the archaeological records and have a strong differentiation in cultural productions. In addition to focusing on geochronology, the key role of Quaternary science to archaeology is to help the archaeologists in resolving some of their major problems relating to its impact on the surrounding environment, the Colonization of human in the past, cultural productions, and its mobility. Quaternary science offers the archaeologist invaluable data which assist them in further understanding the environment and landscape which involved the evolution of the humans during the late Quaternary Period.

Socio-economic impact
Quaternary science has wide-ranging effects, studying things such as the impact of climate changes on animals and human, adaptation of living organisms, and human evolution. A species’ adapting to new changes is a sign that it has been impacted by something. In this case, it is how organisms respond to climate changes. To be able to live, develop, and continue to reproduce, every species relies on upon its ecological requirements – including their environmental factors (climates, geology, etc. However, not all species respond in the same ways when changes happened. Adaptation allows species to evolve to be able to live in the same place despite the climate change. Some adaptations even involve genetic modification. The impact of climate shift has caused species to modify their genome to survive. 

Research was done to examine whether there are any impacts of the pre-Quaternary Period and Quaternary Period on contemporary species richness. Species richness is the number of various species that exist in a certain locations or landscape. The aim of the researchers here is to analyze the roles of the Quaternary climatic oscillations and pre-Quaternary legacies in influencing the worldwide distribution and palm diversity pattern (Aceraceae), and the ecological importance of a diverse group of keystone species in its tropical ecosystem. In the experiment, researchers gathered lists of almost every international species and assembled any related or connected data on possible climates during the Quaternary Period, modern-day environment drivers (such as our current climate, habitat, area, etc.), and vital biogeographic land to gauge the extent to which the global distribution and the patterns of species richness in palms reflect the effect of Quaternary climatic movement and pre-Quaternary legacies. After the experiment, they discovered that Quaternary climates change has significantly affected the richness of the palm species. Moreover, they found out that the global constraint on the distribution of the palm family was influenced by the current climate, whereas the climate during the Quaternary Period only caused a slight constraint.

From many researches, climate changes during the Quaternary Period have impacted the life of many species living in the present day. The research by Silva, Antonelli, Lendel, Moraes, and Manfrin (2018) in Southeastern United States suggests that there was a major impact of the early Quaternary climate change on the spreading and diversity of the Cactus species of South America. Additionally, not only the Quaternary science impacted the plant species and animal species, they also caused some ecological state shift.

An article researched by Barnosky, Lindsey, Villavicencio, et al. (2016) provides evidence which support the findings that megafaunal extinction during the late Quaternary Period has a huge effect in causing several ecological state shifts in North and South America. The loss of megafauna species has caused ecological change over a period of time. The purpose of the research is to examine whether the loss of megafauna species during the ice age could explain the phenomenon of ecological state shifts that have happened as the Pleistocene Epoch gave way to the Holocene Epoch. From their findings, they learned that should large species went extinct like the megafauna, our current ecosystem would be at risk of disappearing. The reason is that, in the megafauna case, those species must have been an effective ecosystem engineer and as a respond to the extinction of megafauna, possible events must have occurred to provide our ecosystem with more plant species, thus, triggering a lasting ecological state shift.

Academic journals

 Boreas – An International Journal of Quaternary Research
 Geografiska Annaler (only the title is in Swedish)
 Journal of Quaternary Science
 Quaternary Geochronology
 Quaternary International
 Quaternary Research
 Quaternary Science Reviews
 The Quaternary Times

See also
 International Union for Quaternary Research
 Palynology
 100,000-year problem
 Geochronology

References

External links
 UK Quaternary Research Association
 Irish Quaternary Association
 Cambridge Quaternary formally the Godwin Institute

Quaternary